The Diocese of Santa Ana is a Latin Church ecclesiastical territory or diocese of the Catholic Church in El Salvador. It is a suffragan diocese in the ecclesiastical province of the metropolitan Archdiocese of San Salvador. The Diocese of Santa Ana was erected on 11 February 1913.

Bishops

Ordinaries
Giacomo Richardo Vilanova y Meléndez (1914–1953)
Benjamin Barrera y Reyes, M.I. (1954–1981)
Marco René Revelo Contreras (1981–1998)
Romeo Tovar Astorga, O.F.M. (1999–2016)
Miguel Angel Moran Aquino (2016– )

Auxiliary bishops
Benjamin Barrera y Reyes, M.J. (1952–1954), appointed Bishop of Santa Ana
Lorenzo Michele Joseph Graziano, O.F.M. (1961-1965), appointed Coadjutor Bishop of San Miguel 
Fernando Sáenz Lacalle, O.F.M. (1984–1995), appointed Archbishop of San Salvador
Luis Morao Andreazza, O.F.M. (2003–2007), appointed Bishop of Chalatenango
José Elías Rauda Gutiérrez, O.F.M. (2008–2009), appointed Bishop of San Vicente

Territorial losses

External links and references

Santa Ana
Santa Ana
Santa Ana
1913 establishments in El Salvador
Roman Catholic Ecclesiastical Province of San Salvador